The JUMPER is a self-contained missile launcher system that was developed by Israel Aerospace Industries. Each vertical launch hive (VLH) has 8 missiles with an integrated command & control unit.

The JUMPER system requires no operating crew and no special platform. The 1.4 x 1.4m and a height of 2m dimension vertical launch hive can be deployed on a truck, ship or ground. An optional laser guidance enhancement will enable the weapon to hit at even higher precision, enable limited 'man in the loop' capability and address moving targets. Each missile is 1800 mm long, has a 150 mm diameter and a weight of 63 kg.

The missile system could receive the location of enemy positions from unmanned air systems in the battlespace; and according to the received data, the JUMPER would launch a number of missiles. The missiles could give a variety of effects including minimal collateral damage. The system can be considered as an example of asymmetric warfare being used on a complex battlefield.

Specifications
Data from Israel Aerospace Industries
 Weight: 
 Diameter: 
 Length: 
 Range: 
 Motor: Two-phase rocket motor
 Overall dimensions: 1.4x1.4x2 m (length x width x height)
 Guidance: GPS/INS
 Datalink: Integrated command and control unit

References

External links 
Jumper Flyer

IAI missiles
Guided missiles of Israel
Proposed weapons of Israel
MLM products